The R586 road is a long regional road in Ireland, located in west County Cork.

References

Regional roads in the Republic of Ireland
Roads in County Cork